Back Brook may refer to:

 Back Brook, English Midlands
 Back Brook (New Jersey)
 Back Brook (Newfoundland)